Pezula Racing were a UCI Continental cycling team registered in Ireland that participated predominantly in races on the UCI Europe Tour. The team was managed by Brian O'Loughlin with assistance from directeur sportif David McQuaid.

Their biggest wins were 2 stages in the 2008 Rás Tailteann

It was announced in July 2008 that due to economic pressures in Ireland and the downturn in the construction industry, Pezula Construction would stop the sponsorship of the team. However, the directeur sportif David McQuaid has stepped in and his company DMC Sports Ireland will take over the sponsorship of the team. This was announced while the team were racing in Quinghai Lake, China.

Major wins 

East Midlands International Cicle Classic, Ciarán Power
Stage 6 FBD Insurance Ras, Ciarán Power
Stage 8 FBD Insurance Ras, David O'Loughlin

2008 squad 
As of 2008 season.

References

External links
 

Defunct cycling teams based in Ireland
Cycling teams established in 2008
Cycling teams disestablished in 2008